Julie Watts  (born 1950) is an Australian author and publisher. She won the Dromkeen Medal in 2001.

Early life
Watts was born in Guildford, Surrey, England. Her mother worked in a second-hand bookshop after Julie was born.

Career
Watts' first job was secretary to the editor of the Royal Institute of Chemistry. She started at Penguin as secretary in the publishing department. She was later promoted to publisher for books for children and young adults.

Since 2005 Watts has worked as a freelance consultant.

Books

 The Art of Graeme Base (co-authored with Graeme Base)

Recognition and awards
Watts received both the Pixie O'Harris Award for Distinguished and Dedicated Service to the Development and Reputation of Australian Children's Books and, in 2001, the Dromkeen Medal for her contribution to children's literature.

In February 2018 Watts won the Dorothy Hewett Award for Legacy, an unpublished manuscript of collected poems.

Watts was awarded the Medal of the Order of Australia for "service to literature" in the 2021 Queen's Birthday Honours.

Other achievements
The Victorian Society of Editors made a presentation based on a transcript from three books and a film of Julie Watts. Bruce Beresford directed the film version.

References

1950 births
Living people
Recipients of the Medal of the Order of Australia
Australian children's writers
Australian publishers (people)